The 1983 Southland Conference men's basketball tournament was held March 10–12 at the Beaumont Civic Center in Beaumont, Texas. This was the third edition of the tournament.

Lamar defeated  in the championship game, 75–54, to win their second Southland men's basketball tournament.

The Cardinals received a bid to the 1983 NCAA Tournament. They were the only Southland member invited to the tournament.

Format
All seven of the conference's members participated in the tournament field. They were seeded based on regular season conference records, with the top seed earning a bye into the semifinal round. The other six teams entered into the quarterfinal round.

All games were played at the Beaumont Civic Center in Beaumont, Texas, the home court of regular season champion Lamar.

Bracket

References

Southland Conference men's basketball tournament
Tournament
Southland Conference men's basketball tournament
Southland Conference men's basketball tournament
Basketball competitions in Texas
College sports tournaments in Texas
Sports in Beaumont, Texas